Pluteus readiarum is a mushroom in the family Pluteaceae. Found in New Zealand, it was described scientifically by New Zealand mycologist Greta Stevenson in 1962.

Description
The cap is convex, reaching  in diameter. The colour is yellow-fawn overlain by a dark-brown velvety network of thread-like filaments. The flesh is pale yellow-fawn. The gills are free from attachment to the stem, crowded closely together, and pink with whitish margins. The base of the stipe is bulbous and surrounded by fuzzy white mycelia. The spore print is pink, and the individual spores measure 5 by 6 μm.

See also
List of Pluteus species

References

readiarum
Fungi described in 1962
Fungi of New Zealand